Istituto Champagnat, Genoa is a school in Genoa, Italy. It was opened by the Marist Brothers in 1905. It educates students from preschool through regular and scientific secondary.

References  

Marist Brothers schools
Catholic schools in Italy
Educational institutions established in 1905
Schools in Genoa
1905 establishments in Italy